The 2013 Cash Converters Players Championship Finals was the sixth edition of the PDC darts tournament, the Players Championship Finals, which saw the top 32 players from the 2013 PDC Pro Tour Order of Merit taking part. The tournament took place from 29 November–1 December 2013 at the Butlin's Resort Minehead in Minehead, England.

Defending champion, Phil Taylor, who had a superb 2013 in winning the World Championship, the UK Open, the World Matchplay, the Sydney Darts Masters, the World Grand Prix, the Championship League, the Masters and the Grand Slam of Darts, looked on course to win the 2013 Players Championship also, when he led Michael van Gerwen 6–3 in the final. However, Taylor then fell victim to one of van Gerwen's purple patches as van Gerwen came back to win 11–7 and take the 2013 Players Championship title.

Prize money

Qualification
This is the final ProTour Order of Merit for 2013 after all Players Championship events, UK Open Qualifiers and European Tour events had been played:

Draw
The playing distance from the second round onwards has been reduced with respect to 2012. From the best of 19, 19, 21 and 25 legs to 17, 17, 19 and 21 legs.

Statistics
{|class="wikitable sortable" style="font-size: 95%; text-align: right"
|-
! Player
! Eliminated
! Played
! Legs Won
! Legs Lost
! LWAT
! 100+
! 140+
! 180s
! High checkout
! 3-dart average
|-
|align="left"| Michael van Gerwen
|Winner
|5
|
|
|
|
|
|
|170
|99.53
|-
|align="left"| Phil Taylor
|Final
|5
|
|
|
|
|
|
|143
|104.37
|-
|align="left"| Justin Pipe
|Semi-finals
|4
|
|
|
|
|
|
|120
|93.41
|-
|align="left"| Andy Hamilton
|Semi-finals
|4
|
|
|
|
|
|
|160
|88.67
|-
|align="left"| Wes Newton
|Quarter-finals
|3
|
|
|
|
|
|
|141
|95.53
|-
|align="left"| Ian White
|Quarter-finals
|3
|
|
|
|
|
|
|100
|93.72
|-
|align="left"| Raymond van Barneveld
|Quarter-finals
|3
|
|
|
|
|
|
|111
|93.40
|-
|align="left"| Gary Anderson
|Quarter-finals
|3
|
|
|
|
|
|
|101
|92.24
|-
|align="left"| Adrian Lewis
|Second round
|2
|
|
|
|
|
|
|88
|99.55
|-
|align="left"| Peter Wright
|Second round
|2
|
|
|
|
|
|
|62
|97.81
|-
|align="left"| Robert Thornton
|Second round
|2
|
|
|
|
|
|
|99
|96.99
|-
|align="left"| Jamie Caven
|Second round
|2
|
|
|
|
|
|
|127
|93.08
|-
|align="left"| Steve Beaton
|Second round
|2
|
|
|
|
|
|
|145
|90.28
|-
|align="left"| Brendan Dolan
|Second round
|2
|
|
|
|
|
|
|126
|90.18
|-
|align="left"| Terry Jenkins
|Second round
|2
|
|
|
|
|
|
|84
|89.47
|-
|align="left"| Jelle Klaasen
|Second round
|2
|
|
|
|
|
|
|135
|84.84
|-
|align="left"| James Wade
|First round
|1
|
|
|
|
|
|
|80
|100.72
|-
|align="left"| Mervyn King
|First round
|1
|
|
|
|
|
|
|140
|96.70
|-
|align="left"| Michael Smith
|First round
|1
|
|
|
|
|
|
|11
|95.30
|-
|align="left"| Andy Smith
|First round
|1
|
|
|
|
|
|
|80
|94.74
|-
|align="left"| Wayne Jones
|First round
|1
|
|
|
|
|
|
|80
|94.30
|-
|align="left"| Dave Chisnall
|First round
|1
|
|
|
|
|
|
|65
|94.22
|-
|align="left"| Kevin Painter
|First round
|1
|
|
|
|
|
|
|126
|94.05
|-
|align="left"| Richie Burnett
|First round
|1
|
|
|
|
|
|
|78
|93.43
|-
|align="left"| Kim Huybrechts
|First round
|1
|
|
|
|
|
|
|52
|92.72
|-
|align="left"| Stuart Kellett
|First round
|1
|
|
|
|
|
|
|52
|90.61
|-
|align="left"| Simon Whitlock
|First round
|1
|
|
|
|
|
|
|82
|90.16
|-
|align="left"| Colin Lloyd
|First round
|1
|
|
|
|
|
|
|64
|88.51
|-
|align="left"| Paul Nicholson
|First round
|1
|
|
|
|
|
|
|16
|86.25
|-
|align="left"| Ronnie Baxter
|First round
|1
|
|
|
|
|
|
|40
|86.18
|-
|align="left"| Jamie Lewis
|First round
|1
|
|
|
|
|
|
|5
|85.11
|-
|align="left"| John Part
|First round
|1
|
|
|
|
|
|
|52
|81.83
|-

References 

Players Championship Finals
Players Championship Finals
Players Championship Finals
Minehead
Sports competitions in Somerset
2010s in Somerset
Players Championship Finals
Players Championship Finals